Sean Crombie (born 25 June 1986) is a former Scotland 7s international rugby union player. He played at hooker.

Rugby Union career

Amateur career

He won the Scottish Premiership with Boroughmuir.

Crombie received the first ever U.A.E Player of the Year in 2014 after winning 6 championships in a row with the world-famous Jebel Ali Dragons of Dubai. This was the first of its kind in the country and was hosted by ex Scotland Captain Rory Lawson and guests included Steve Thomson and Jonah Lomu.

He played for Aberdeen GSFP.

Professional career

He played for Border Reivers.

He played for Edinburgh Rugby in the Celtic League.

He played for Newcastle Falcons.

International career

He has been capped for the Scotland U19s and Scotland U21s.

He played for Scotland 7s in San Diego, Wellington and Hong Kong.

Investment career

He is now an Investment Assistant at Social Investment Scotland.

References

1986 births
Living people
Scottish rugby union players
Edinburgh Rugby players
Boroughmuir RFC players
Rugby union players from Kirkcaldy
Black British sportspeople
Glenrothes RFC players
Scotland international rugby sevens players
Male rugby sevens players